The Gibraltar School District is a school district headquartered in Brownstown Township, Michigan.

It serves Gibraltar, Rockwood, and portions of Brownstown, Flat Rock, and Woodhaven.

Schools
Chapman Elementary School (Rockwood)
Early Childhood Center (Rockwood)
Frank E. Weiss Elementary School (Woodhaven)
Hunter Elementary School (Brownstown Township)
Parsons Elementary School (Gibraltar)
Special Education Cooperative Center (Woodhaven, formerly South Road Elementary School)
Shumate Middle School (Gibraltar)
Carlson High School (Gibraltar)
Downriver High School (Brownstown Township, formerly Barrow Elementary School) (demolished 2018)

References

External links
 Gibraltar School District

Education in Wayne County, Michigan
School districts in Michigan